Davao City's at-large congressional district may refer to two occasions when a city-wide at-large district was used for elections to Philippine national legislatures from Davao City.

The district was first formed ahead of the 1943 Philippine legislative election following the ratification of the Second Philippine Republic constitution which called for a unicameral legislature composed of delegates from all provinces and chartered cities in the country. Davao, a chartered city since 1936, elected Celestino Chávez to the National Assembly, who was joined by then-mayor Alfonso Oboza as an appointed second delegate. The district became inactive following the restoration of the House of Representatives in 1945 when the city reverted to its old provincial constituency of Davao's at-large congressional district and its successor Davao del Sur's at-large congressional district.

The district was again utilized in the 1984 Philippine parliamentary election when Davao City was granted two seats in the Batasang Pambansa as a highly-urbanized city. After 1986, the city elected its representatives from three single-member congressional districts drawn under a new constitution.

Representation history

See also
Legislative districts of Davao City

References

Former congressional districts of the Philippines
Politics of Davao City
1943 establishments in the Philippines
1944 disestablishments in the Philippines
1984 establishments in the Philippines
1986 disestablishments in the Philippines
At-large congressional districts of the Philippines
Congressional districts of the Davao Region
Constituencies established in 1943
Constituencies disestablished in 1944
Constituencies established in 1984
Constituencies established in 1986